The pighead prickleback (Acantholumpenus mackayi), also known as the blackline prickleback, is a species of marine ray-finned fish belonging to the family Stichaeidae, the pricklebacks and shannies. It is the only species in the monotypic genus Acantholumpenus. This fish is found in the Arctic and North Pacific Oceans.

References

Lumpeninae
Fish described in 1896
Taxa named by Charles Henry Gilbert
Monotypic fish genera